Quintus Sulpicius Camerinus was a Roman senator and poet, who served as Consul in AD 9 as the colleague of Gaius Poppaeus Sabinus. He is particularly remembered for his poem about the capture of Troy by Hercules. Ovid wrote about him in Ponto memoravit. He is a member of the gens Sulpicia.

References

1st-century Romans
1st-century Roman poets
Imperial Roman consuls
Sulpicii
Year of birth unknown
Year of death unknown